Saverton Township is an inactive township in Ralls County, in the U.S. state of Missouri.

Saverton Township takes its name from the community of Saverton, Missouri.

References

Townships in Missouri
Townships in Ralls County, Missouri